Michael Edward Abney-Hastings, 14th Earl of Loudoun (born Michael Edward Lord; 22 July 194230 June 2012), was a British-Australian farmer, who is most noted because of the 2004 documentary Britain's Real Monarch, which alleged he was the rightful monarch of England instead of Queen Elizabeth II. From February 1960 until November 2002, he held the courtesy title Lord Mauchline.

Loudoun was born in England and educated at Ampleforth College in Yorkshire, but emigrated to Jerilderie, New South Wales, as a teen, where he was a rice farmer and family man. He was the heir-general of George Plantagenet, the younger brother of Edward IV of England. If Edward IV had been illegitimate and the crown of England had descended by male-preference primogeniture before 1500, then George (and his heirs) would have been monarchs of England.

Abney-Hastings died on 30 June 2012 in New South Wales.

Early life
Abney-Hastings was born in Sussex, England, to Captain Walter Strickland Lord and Barbara Abney-Hastings, 13th Countess of Loudoun, under the name Michael Edward Lord. He later lived at Ashby-de-la-Zouch in Leicestershire, and his name was legally changed via deed poll to Michael Edward Abney-Hastings in 1946. As a youth, he was educated at Ampleforth College in North Yorkshire, before moving to Australia when he was 18 years old.

Claim to the English throne

In 2004, Britain's Real Monarch, a documentary broadcast on Channel 4 in the United Kingdom, repeated the claim that Abney-Hastings, as the senior descendant of George Plantagenet, 1st Duke of Clarence, is the rightful King of England. This argument involves two disputed claims: first, that Edward IV of England was illegitimate, based on the accusation that his supposed father, Richard, Duke of York, was absent at the time when Edward is thought to have been conceived; and second, that the Plantagenet crown should have descended by male-preference cognatic primogeniture instead of agnatic primogeniture and conquest. Also, Henry VI had placed an attainder on Edward after he was restored to the throne, and named George, Duke of Clarence, as heir to the throne after Henry VI and his legitimate issue.

Personal views and family
Abney-Hastings was a committed Australian republican and expressed no interest in pursuing his claim to the throne, although he was amused by it. He refrained from using his title publicly.

Abney-Hastings had two sons and three daughters with his wife, Noelene Margaret (née McCormick; married 1969). His eldest son, Simon, held the courtesy title Lord Mauchline until his father's death on 30 June 2012. Until his death, the 14th Earl was one of the seven co-heirs to the Barony of Grey de Ruthyn.

 Lady Amanda Louise Abney-Hastings (born 1969)
 Lady Lisa Maree Abney-Hastings (1971–2012)
 Simon Michael Abney-Hastings, 15th Earl of Loudoun (born 1974)
 Lady Rebecca Lee Abney-Hastings (born 1974)
 The Hon. Marcus William Abney-Hastings (born 1981)

Abney-Hastings was a councillor of the Jerilderie Shire, elected in 2004 and re-elected in 2008.

References

Citations

Sources

External links
 Channel 4: Britain's Real Monarch

1942 births
2012 deaths
Earls of Loudoun
Australian peers
English people of Scottish descent
Australian people of Scottish descent
People educated at Ampleforth College
People from Ashby-de-la-Zouch
English emigrants to Australia
People from the Riverina
New South Wales local councillors
Australian republicans